Yin and yang are concepts in Chinese philosophy, used to describe how opposite or contrary forces are actually complementary.

The yin and yang symbol, known as Taijitu, refers to a Chinese symbol for the concept of yin and yang. 

Yin and yang, yin yang or yin-yang may also refer to:

Music
Yin-Yang (group), Russian-Ukrainian pop group
Ying Yang Twins, Atlanta-based American hip hop duo 
Yin and Yang (albums), two separate compilation albums by Fish co-released in 1995
Yin & Yang (album), an album by Nikolija
Yin-Yang (album), third album released by Victor Wooten
The Yin and the Yang, 2001 album of Wu-Tang Clan member Cappadonna
Lil' Mo' Yin Yang, collaborative house-music act of producers and DJs Erick Morillo and Little Louie Vega

Others
Yin Yang fish, also called dead-and-alive fish, dish in Taiwanese cuisine 
Yin Yang Yo!, American-Canadian animated television series created by Bob Boyle II
Yin-Yang! X-Change Alternative, Japanese erotic game 
Yin-Yang! X-Change Alternative 2, sequel to above 
Yin-Yang, fictional character, eleventh King of Xanth, able to create invokable spells in Magicians of Xanth from the Xanth series
YY1 or Yin Yang 1, a transcriptional repressor protein in humans that is encoded by the YY1 gene
The Yin and the Yang of Mr. Go, 1970 British film directed by Burgess Meredith

See also
Yang Yin (511–560), courtesy name Zhunyan nicknamed Qinwang, a high-level official of the Chinese dynasty Northern Qi
Triple yin yang (disambiguation)
Onmyoji (disambiguation) (which uses Yin-Yang or Yinyang)